A list of films produced by the Tollywood (Bengali language film industry) based in Kolkata in the year 2005.

Highest-grossing
 Yuddho

A-Z of films

References

External links
 Tollywood films of 2005 at the Internet Movie Database

2005
Lists of 2005 films by country or language
2005 in Indian cinema